The 2018 Polish Speedway season was the 2018 season of motorcycle speedway in Poland.

Individual

Polish Individual Speedway Championship
The 2018 Individual Speedway Polish Championship final was held on 4 August at Leszno. Piotr Pawlicki Jr. won the Polish Championship.

Golden Helmet
The 2018 Golden Golden Helmet organised by the Polish Motor Union (PZM) was the 2018 event for the league's leading riders. The final was held at Piła on the 19 kwietnia. Jarosław Hampel won the Golden Helmet.

Junior Championship
 winner - Daniel Kaczmarek

Silver Helmet
 winner - Bartosz Smektała

Bronze Helmet
 winner - Dominik Kubera

Pairs

Polish Pairs Speedway Championship
The 2018 Polish Pairs Speedway Championship was the 2018 edition of the Polish Pairs Speedway Championship. The final was held on 3 May at Ostrów Wielkopolski.

Team

Team Speedway Polish Championship
The 2018 Team Speedway Polish Championship was the 2018 edition of the Team Polish Championship. Unia Leszno won the gold medal for the second successive season. The team included Emil Saifutdinov, Janusz Kołodziej, Piotr Pawlicki Jr., Bartosz Smektała and Jarosław Hampel.

Ekstraliga

Play offs

1.Liga

Play offs

2.Liga

Play offs

References

Poland Individual
Poland Team
Speedway
2018 in Polish speedway